Posh is an informal adjective for "upper class". It may also refer to:

Entertainment
Posh (album), a 1980 album by Patrice Rushen
"Posh!", a 1968 song from the musical Chitty Chitty Bang Bang
Posh (2006 TV series), a 2006 Philippine television drama
Posh (play), by the British playwright Laura Wade, first staged in 2010
The Riot Club, formerly titled Posh, a 2014 film adaptation of the play

Computing
Plain Old Semantic HTML, a term used by the microformat community to describe some uses of Semantic HTML
Poshlib, the Portable Open Source Harness
PowerShell, sometimes abbreviated PoSh

Other
Victoria Beckham (born 1974), singer nicknamed "Posh Spice" while she was a member of the Spice Girls
Peterborough United F.C., an English football club, nicknamed "The Posh" 
Received Pronunciation, sometimes known as a "posh accent"
Posh (Haganah unit), the commando arm of the Haganah during the 1936–1939 Arab revolt in Palestine
 Sexual Harassment of Women at Workplace (Prevention, Prohibition and Redressal) Act, 2013 - Indian law, also called and popular as Prevention Of Sexual Harassment (POSH)
Polyolefin Oligomeric Saturated Hydrocarbons

See also
Bacha posh, a cultural practice in parts of Afghanistan and Pakistan 
Pish Posh, a children's novel by Ellen Potter
Sped-Posh, Siah-Posh and Safed-Posh, historic subdivisions of the Nuristani Afghani ethnic group
 
Posch, a surname